The South African Railways Class Experimental 4  of 1903 was a steam locomotive from the pre-Union era in the Cape of Good Hope.

In 1903, the Cape Government Railways placed two 9th Class steam locomotives with a  Mikado type wheel arrangement in service. In 1912, when they were assimilated into the South African Railways, they were renumbered and designated Class Experimental 4.

Manufacturer
The Cape 9th Class locomotive was designed by H.M. Beatty, the Locomotive Superintendent of the Cape Government Railways (CGR) from 1896 to 1910. They were the first South African locomotives to have a  Mikado wheel arrangement and they were built with bar frames, had Stephenson’s Link valve gear and used saturated steam. Two locomotives were delivered by Kitson and Company in 1903, numbered 805 and 806.

Characteristics

The locomotives were delivered with Type XE1 tenders. Their intermediate and driving coupled wheels were flangeless to allow them to cope with tight curves, such as in turnouts.

With these locomotives, Beatty attempted to combine the best design features and good qualities of his Cape 8th Class  locomotive of 1901 with the improved steaming which was obtained from a wide firegrate. In many respects, they were enlarged versions of the two Cape 6th Class  locomotives which were delivered by Kitson in the same year, with many features in common.

Performance
They were placed in service on the mainline between De Aar and Kimberley.

In comparison with the Cape 8th Class, it was found that their operational and maintenance costs were much higher without any advantage in terms of efficiency. As a result, no more of the type were ordered.

Reclassification
When the Union of South Africa was established on 31 May 1910, the three Colonial government railways (CGR, Natal Government Railways and Central South African Railways) were united under a single administration to control and administer the railways, ports and harbours of the Union. Although the South African Railways and Harbours came into existence in 1910, the actual classification and renumbering of all the rolling stock of the three constituent railways were only implemented with effect from 1 January 1912.

In 1912, the locomotives were designated Class Experimental 4 and renumbered to 910 and 911 on the SAR. They were withdrawn from service and scrapped in 1930.

References

2130
2130
2-8-2 locomotives
1D1 locomotives
Kitson locomotives
Cape gauge railway locomotives
Railway locomotives introduced in 1903
1903 in South Africa
Scrapped locomotives